Karur block is a revenue block in the Karur district of Tamil Nadu, India. It has a total of 14 panchayat villages.

References
 

Revenue blocks of Karur district